Douglas Grey Lewis (born January 18, 1964) is a former World Cup alpine ski racer with the U.S. Ski Team in the mid-1980s.
Born in Middlebury, Vermont, he was a two-time Olympian in 1984 and 1988.

After competing in the 1984 Olympics at age 20, Lewis made his World Cup debut a month later in March 1984 with an 8th-place finish at Whistler, BC.  The following season, Lewis had two World Cup top ten finishes and was the bronze medalist in the downhill at the 1985 World Championships at  He was unknown at that time, and having a bib number behind the best 15 racers he did gatecrash a party of three Swiss racers on the podium (and pushing away Franz Heinzer). His only World Cup podium came six months later, a second-place finish in Las Leñas, Argentina, in August 1985.

Lewis is currently an analyst for alpine ski racing with Universal Sports, and also runs a children's sports camp with locations in Waitsfield, Vermont, and Park City, Utah. He is a 1991 graduate of the University of Vermont.

World Cup results

Season standings

Points were only awarded for top fifteen finishes (see scoring system).

Top ten finishes

World championship results

Olympic results

References

External links
 
 Doug Lewis World Cup standings at the International Ski Federation
 
 
 eliteam.com – profile – Doug Lewis
 Stowe Today.com – photo of Doug Lewis – medal ceremony – 1985 World Championships

American male alpine skiers
Alpine skiers at the 1984 Winter Olympics
Alpine skiers at the 1988 Winter Olympics
Olympic alpine skiers of the United States
People from Middlebury, Vermont
Sportspeople from Vermont
University of Vermont alumni
Vermont Catamounts skiers
1964 births
Living people